Hospital Infanta Sofía is the northern terminus of Line 10 of the Madrid Metro. It is located in fare Zone B1.

References 

Line 10 (Madrid Metro) stations
Railway stations in Spain opened in 2007
San Sebastián de los Reyes